Karula Upland is hilly area of higher elevation in Southern Estonia.

Upland's area is about 350 km².

The highest point of upland is Tornimägi (137 m).

References

Hills of Estonia